Jabr was a young Christian slave who belonged to the Banu i-Hadrami tribe of Mecca, Jabr was later called a companion of the Islamic prophet Muhammad.

Accusations of informants contributing to Muhammad's recitations were made by his opponents. Jabr is identified by name in one account mentioned by 8th-century Quran story teller, Muqatil ibn Sulayman:

{{Quote
|text=The apostle used to sit at al-Marwa at the booth of a young Christian called Jabr, slave of Banu I-Hadrami, and they used to say; 'The one who teaches Muhammad most of what he brings is Jabr the Christian, slave of the Banu I-Hadrami.'''}}

Similar accounts mention a slave of the Banu I-Hadrami while not the name Jabr'' specifically.

References

Bibliography

Arab Christians
Arabian slaves and freedmen
Companions of the Prophet